Albert Heisé (13 May 1899 – 7 January 1951) was a French sprinter. He competed in the men's 100 metres and the 4x100 metres relay events at the 1924 Summer Olympics.

References

External links
 

1899 births
1951 deaths
Athletes (track and field) at the 1924 Summer Olympics
French male sprinters
Olympic athletes of France
Sportspeople from Bas-Rhin